Mai Cascade Hydropower Station is a run-of-the-river hydroelectric power station with an installed capacity of 7 MW. This power station is located at  Danabari VDC in Ilam district of Nepal. The plant utilizes tail water of Mai Hydropower Station. The construction of power station started on 2013 and completed in 2015.

The power is evacuated through 33 kV transmission line of about 4.0 km length up to switchyard area of Mai hydropower project. The transmission line is further connected to the national grid of Nepal through the 132KV transmission line.

See also

Mai Hydropower Station

References

Hydroelectric power stations in Nepal
Gravity dams
Run-of-the-river power stations
Dams in Nepal
Dams completed in 2015
Energy infrastructure completed in 2015
2015 establishments in Nepal
Buildings and structures in Ilam District